John P. Jones may refer to:

John Percival Jones (1829–1912), American politician
John Paul Jones (1747–1792), Scottish-American naval captain
John Paul Jones (Louisiana politician) (fl. 1912 to 1916)

See also
 John Paul Jones (disambiguation)